Children's Laureate, now known as the Waterstones Children's Laureate, is a prestigious position awarded in the United Kingdom once every two years to a "writer or illustrator of children's books to celebrate outstanding achievement in their field." The role promotes the importance of children’s literature, reading, creativity and storytelling while promoting the right of every child to enjoy a lifetime of books and stories. Each Laureate uses their tenure to focus on an aspect of children’s books – these have included poetry, storytelling, readers with disabilities and illustration. 

The aim of the Waterstones Children’s Laureateship is to celebrate and promote creativity, storytelling and inspiring all children to read a rich and diverse range of stories. The Laureateship also promotes the importance of children’s books, reading and champions the right of every child to enjoy a life rich in books and stories. The post stemmed from a discussion between the (now deceased) Poet Laureate Ted Hughes and children's writer Michael Morpurgo. The Waterstones Children's Laureate receives a £30,000 bursary and an inscribed silver medal.

The main sponsor of the Waterstones Children's Laureate is Waterstones, with additional funding from Arts Council England and support from children's publishers. A selection panel considers nominations from a range of organisations representing librarians and sellers, including the International Board on Books for Young People. The Waterstones Children's Laureate is managed by BookTrust, who supports the Laureate, organise events and run the official website.

The post is currently held by Joseph Coelho.

UK officeholders

Comparable offices elsewhere

Australia
In 2008, an Australian Children's Literature Alliance was founded to select and appoints an annual Australian Children's Laureate. In fact the first year saw two writers sharing the role. Boori Monty Pryor and Alison Lester were announced in Adelaide in December 2011, with Noni Hazlehurst as patron.

Ireland
Ireland has a Laureate na nÓg, a two-year office inaugurated by the Arts Council of Ireland in May 2010. The Arts Council of Northern Ireland is one supporter.

The Netherlands
From 2013, every two years, the Dutch Reading Foundation appoints a well-known children's books author as an ambassador for children's literature. Since 2017, this 'Kinderboekenambassadeur' has a seat in his special embassy in the Children's Book Museum in The Hague.

Sweden
The Swedish Arts Council appoints an author as "Ambassador for reading", Läsamabassadör, for a two-year office since 2011. The ambassador is announced at Gothenburg Book Fair by the Swedish Minister of Culture. As part of the tenure, the ambassador help communicate to children about books and reading.

United States
In January 2008, the Library of Congress inaugurated its National Ambassador for Young People's Literature scheme, as the U.S. equivalent of the Children's Laureate. The inaugural Ambassador was Jon Scieszka. A similar honour is awarded bi-annually by the Poetry Foundation for the Young People's Poet Laureate.

See also

 Blue Peter Book Awards
 Carnegie Medal
 Comics Laureate
 Guardian Award
 Kate Greenaway Medal
 Nestlé Smarties Book Prize

References

Citations
 Children's Laureate (childrenslaureate.org.uk). Booktrust. Retrieved 2013-09-28.

External links
 

 
British children's literary awards
British children's literature
1999 establishments in the United Kingdom